This is a list of films released by the British distribution company General Film Distributors. GFD was part of the Rank Organisation, and handled films produced by the various companies controlled by or linked to Rank including Gainsborough Pictures, Two Cities Films and Ealing Studios. The list also includes films released by Rank's other distribution outlet Eagle-Lion Films. Foreign films which were handled in Britain by GFD, such as imports from the Hollywood studio Universal Pictures, are not included. In 1955 GFD was abolished and replaced by Rank Film Distributors.

1930s

1940s

1950s

Rank Film Distributors

Bibliography
 Macnab, Geoffrey. J. Arthur Rank and the British Film Industry. Routledge, 1994.
Wood, Linda. British Films, 1927–1939. British Film Institute, 1986.

See also
 List of Gainsborough Pictures films
 List of Ealing Studios films
 List of Stoll Pictures films
 List of British Lion films
 List of British National films
 List of British and Dominions films
 List of Two Cities Films
 List of Paramount British films

General Film Distributors